New Zealand competed at the 2020 Summer Paralympics in Tokyo, Japan. Originally to be held from 25 August to 6 September 2020, the event has been postponed by one year due to the COVID-19 pandemic and is now being held from 24 August to 5 September 2021. It was New Zealand's 14th appearance at Summer Paralympics.

Medalists

Competitors

Officials
Former Paralympic cyclist and gold medallist Paula Tesoriero was appointed Chef de Mission in 2019.

Athletics 

In May 2021, New Zealand announced a squad of six track and field athletes to compete at the Summer Paralympics — Holly Robinson, Caitlin Dore, Anna Grimaldi, William Stedman, Lisa Adams and Danielle Aitchison. In July 2021, shot putter Ben Tuimaseve was added to the team. In August 2021, sprinter Anna Steven was added to the team.

Track

Field

Canoeing 

In June 2021, New Zealand announced a team of two para canoe athletes for the Summer Paralympics — Corbin Hart and Scott Martlew.

Cycling 

In July 2021, New Zealand confirmed a team of six cyclists to compete at the Summer Paralympics — Stephen Hills, Sarah Ellington, Eltje Malzbender, Rory Mead, Nicole Murray and Anna Taylor.

Road

Track

Shooting 

In July 2021, New Zealand confirmed the selection of sport shooter Michael Johnson for his fifth Paralympic Games.

Swimming 

In April 2021, New Zealand announced a squad of five swimmers to compete at the Summer Paralympics — Sophie Pascoe, Cameron Leslie, Jesse Reynolds, Nikita Howarth and Tupou Neiufi. Leslie subsequently withdrew from the Games.

Wheelchair rugby

New Zealand national wheelchair rugby team qualified for the Games for the games by winning the gold medal at the 2019 Asia-Oceania Championship in Gangneung, South Korea.

Team roster
In May 2021, New Zealand announced a team of eight wheelchair rugby players to be coached by Greg Mitchell: In July 2021, Barney Koneferenisi replaced Cameron Leslie, who withdrew from the Games.

 Hayden Barton-Cootes
 Cody Everson
 Robert Hewitt
 Barney Koneferenisi
 Tainafi Lefono
 Gareth Lynch
 Gavin Rolton (captain)
 Mike Todd

Group stage

Seventh place match

See also
New Zealand at the Paralympics
New Zealand at the 2020 Summer Olympics

References

Nations at the 2020 Summer Paralympics
2020
2021 in New Zealand sport